Betharga is a genus of moths of the family Yponomeutidae.

Species
Betharga lycoides - Walker, 1865 

Yponomeutidae